Wang Fei (born 22 March 1990) is a Chinese footballer who plays as a goalkeeper for Chinese club Dalian Quanjian and the China national team.

Club career
After spending years playing for several Chinese clubs, Wang Fei signed for Frauen-Bundesliga side Turbine Potsdam in December 2014. She became the first ever Chinese footballer to play in the Frauen-Bundesliga. Turbine's veteran manager Bernd Schröder praised the impact made by Wang and compared her to respected German goalkeeper Nadine Angerer; however, Schröder surprisingly selected departing goalkeeper Anna Felicitas Sarholz ahead of Wang for the 2015 DFB-Pokal final which ended in a 3–0 loss against VfL Wolfsburg.

In September 2015, Wang transferred to Division 1 Féminine champions Olympique Lyon. In January 2016, she terminated her contract with the club; however, the club demanded for her return when Méline Gérard was injured.

On 17 January 2016, Wang transferred to Chinese Women's Super League side Dalian Quanjian. In December 2017 Bayern Munich announced that Wang had agreed an 18-month contract with the Bavarian club, to commence 1 January 2018.

International career
Wang played at the 2011 Summer Universiade and was the regular for China's gold medal-winning run. She made her debut for the Chinese women's national team on 24 November 2012 in a 2–1 win against Australia at the 2013 EAFF Women's East Asian Cup.

Wang was also included in China's squad for the 2015 FIFA Women's World Cup. During the tournament, Wang was described by FIFA as tall, agile and one of China's "most impressive performers" in the team's progress to the knockout stages. This was despite her playing through the pain of an injured shoulder which was sustained on 11 June 2015 in a 1–0 win against the Netherlands.

In February 2016, Wang retired from China after getting into several confrontations with manager Bruno Bini and not being called up to the national team as a result. In February 2018, she was included in China's squad for the 2018 Algarve Cup.

Honours
Dalian Quanjian
Chinese Women's Super League: 2016

China PR
Summer Universiade: 2011
Four Nations Tournament: 2014, 2016

References

External links

Profile at 1. FFC Turbine Potsdam 

1990 births
1. FFC Turbine Potsdam players
2015 FIFA Women's World Cup players
Women's association football goalkeepers
China women's international footballers
Chinese women's footballers
Living people
Footballers from Dalian
Olympique Lyonnais Féminin players
Footballers at the 2014 Asian Games
Dalian Quanjian F.C. players
Chinese Women's Super League players
FC Bayern Munich (women) players
Division 1 Féminine players
Universiade gold medalists for China
Universiade medalists in football
Asian Games competitors for China
Chinese expatriate footballers
Chinese expatriate sportspeople in Germany
Expatriate women's footballers in Germany
Chinese expatriate sportspeople in France
Expatriate women's footballers in France